Les Gauloises bleues is a 1968 French drama film directed by Michel Cournot. It was listed to compete at the 1968 Cannes Film Festival, but the festival was cancelled due to the events of May 1968 in France.

Cast
 Annie Girardot – La mère
 Jean-Pierre Kalfon – Ivan à 30 ans
 Nella Bielski – Jeanne
 Bruno Cremer – Le père
 Georges Demestre – Ivan à 6 ans
 Anne Wiazemsky – L'infirmière
 Tanya Lopert – La Mort
 Karina Gondy – L'assistante sociale
 Henri Garcin – L'ambulancier rabatteur
 Tsilla Chelton – La directrice
 Liza Braconnier – Infirmière
 Jean Lescot – Un chasseur
 Marcello Pagliero – Le marchand bohémien
 François Périer – Le juge
 José Varela – Le juriste

References

External links

1968 films
1960s French-language films
1968 drama films
Films directed by Michel Cournot
French drama films
1960s French films